Najmus Sadat (born 22 October 1984) is a Bangladeshi cricketer. He made his List A debut for Dhaka Division on 12 April 2005.

References

External links
 

1984 births
Living people
Bangladeshi cricketers
Dhaka Division cricketers
Cricketers from Dhaka